Blankenese Low Lighthouse is a lighthouse on the river Elbe, located in the Hamburg district of Blankenese. The previous one entered into service in 1984 and was demolished in November 2020, but replaced by a similar some 200 m river upwards. Blankenese Low Lighthouse and Blankenese High Lighthouse form a range of lights for ships sailing upriver on the Elbe. With a range of 8.4 Kilometres, they have the longest range on the lower Elbe river.

Description 
It is made of steel and stands 33 meters tall. The column is striped in red and white with a white steel lantern house at the top with some portholes. It is positioned approximately 30 meter offshore in the river Elbe and some 100 m to the Pier. On the base of the tower is a 7.5 m high level staircase deck. Inside it has a helix staircase going to the top. At the higher podium floor is a door entrance of the structure.

The lighthouse is remotely controlled by the Seemanshöft Pilot Centre and belongs to the Hamburg Port Authority.

Due to the offshore location of the lighthouse, a caisson was used to build the concrete foundation to a depth of 10 meters below the water surface. The lantern house was assembled with the help of a floating crane.

Replacement 
Due to adjustments to the Elbe fairway, both the High and the Low Lighthouses replaced older ones which were demolished. The Demolition was made by Company Taucher Knoth starting on 5 November 2020 and finishing prior 2021.

See also 
 List of lighthouses and lightvessels in Germany

References

External links 
 
 Daten und Bilder bei leuchtturm-atlas.de 
 Daten bei leuchtturm-web.de 
 Beschreibung auf leuchttuerme.net 
 Bilder und Beschreibung 

Lighthouses in Hamburg
Buildings and structures in Altona, Hamburg
Demolished buildings and structures in Germany